The Association of Independent Professionals and the Self-Employed (IPSE) is a British not-for-profit organisation. It was established in 1999 as the Professional Contractors Group, a protest group against the IR35 tax statute. Later, it expanded its responsibilities to cover the wider interests of freelance consultants and contractors as a representative body for freelancing in the UK. It is a company limited by guarantee, owned and run by its members. In September 2014 the PCG changed its name to IPSE, and increased its constituency to the entirety of Britain's 4.3 million freelance and self-employed workers.

Issues on which IPSE (formerly PCG) has campaigned 
 IR35: PCG challenged this legislation with a Judicial Review and continues to lobby for its replacement. In November 2010 Chris Bryce, the current Chairman of PCG, took up a seat on the consultative committee of the small business taxation group of the Office of Tax Simplification.
 S660A: PCG took the first test case (Arctic Systems) on this issue - the admissibility of husband-and-wife businesses for tax purposes - through the courts and won.  It continues to lobby government against changes aimed at restoring HMRC’s interpretation of the statute.
 Managed Service Company legislation: PCG campaigned to ensure that the legislation was not unfairly applied to companies outside the intended target.
 IR591: In his Pre-Budget Report of 2003, Gordon Brown announced plans for a new tax measure aimed at freelance contractors, but did not publish any details for consultation. PCG lobbied the government extensively and launched a public campaign: the resulting measure, a 19% corporation tax rate for firms with profits of less than £50,000 and the abolition of the zero starting rate introduced a couple of years previously, was the "least worst" of all possible outcomes.
 Agency Regulations: in 2002 the government introduced a set of regulations covering all workers who acquire work via recruitment agencies. PCG negotiated successfully to secure an opt-out from the regulations for contractors.
 Software patents: although not an IT specific organisation, PCG responded to the concern expressed by its members in IT at the proposed directive on the patentability of computer-implemented inventions, commonly referred to as the software patents directive. As the UK’s IT bodies were all in favour of software patents, PCG campaigned against the directive. The European Parliament rejected the directive on 6 July 2005.
 Work permits: from 2000, the IT contracting market became depressed, yet the government still listed IT as an area in which skills shortage existed and therefore gave prioritised entry to the UK for IT workers from overseas. Lobbying by PCG led to IT being removed from the skills shortage list in 2002.
 Offshoring: PCG has undertaken the first empirical study of the effects of offshoring (whereby a company’s IT services, for instance, are performed by a service provider in another country), which suggests that the cost benefits promised on paper often fail to materialise in practice. PCG is campaigning on this issue because the UK’s IT bodies do not see it as a problem, although it is increasingly also becoming an issue in other sectors represented by PCG.
 Abuse of the intra-company transfer rules by major corporations in the UK. The PCG alleges that some companies are misusing the immigration rules that allow company employees to enter the UK. A campaign website (www.ictabuse.org.uk) has been set up to explain the allegations in detail.
 Encouraging the use of Freelance workers within industry. PCG run a campaign to promote the use of freelance workers called Britain's Brain Gain.

Member services 

IPSE offers its members a range of services as part of its membership package. These include:

 Tax and legal helplines
 Insurance cover against disputes with Her Majesty's Revenue and Customs
 Access to members-only discussion forums
 Standard template contracts
 Extensive guidance documents on IR35, S660A, agency regulations and how to go about setting up as a freelance contractor

In addition, IPSE runs a number of schemes for the benefit of its members, including an Approved Contract Scheme whereby agencies who offer contacts that are sound both commercially and from a tax perspective are marked as PCG approved.

Structure of IPSE 
The Chairman and Directors of IPSE are responsible for the organisation's strategic direction. IPSE's executive team look after the day-to-day operations of the organisation. The elected Consultative Council (CC) elects six Directors from the membership. Directors serve a maximum of two terms of three years.

A 30-person strong Consultative Council (CC) forms the advisory body of IPSE; it consists of IPSE members elected by the IPSE membership. Council members serve a maximum of two three-year terms with a term limit of two terms; terms must be separated by a period of at least three years. One third of council members are elected each year. The council annually elects candidates to the non-executive Board of Directors  from a list of nominated IPSE members. IPSE's staff are accountable to this board.

Notes

External links
 The Association of Independent Professionals and the Self Employed

1999 establishments in the United Kingdom
Independent Professionals